Mobile virtual network operators (MVNOs) in the United States lease wireless telephone and data service from the three major cellular carriers in the country, AT&T Mobility, T-Mobile US, and Verizon, as well as the regional carriers such as UScellular, for resale. , MVNOs across the nation such as Metro by T-Mobile, Boost Mobile, Cricket Wireless, and Tracfone brands including Straight Talk have served about 36 million subscribers.

Voice and data service operators
In general, the types of phones and other devices supported by the MVNOs are in line with the technologies used by the Mobile Network Operator (MNO), the underlying cellular network provider. All major and regional MNOs use 4G LTE / LTE Advanced and 5G NR protocols (2G and 3G having been deprecated and shut down), under either GSM (T-Mobile and AT&T) or CDMA (Verizon and UScellular) technologies.

However, many MVNOs tend to sell somewhat older phone models (e.g. ones discontinued by the host networks), which can affect whether all technologies supported by the carrier network are usable by MVNO customers.  The acronym BYOD means "Bring Your Own Device", indicating that a customer can port a cellphone or other cellular device they already own to the MVNO, rather than having to buy/rent a new device from them (assuming it is compatible with the host network, has not been reported stolen, is not still locked into a contract, etc.). MVNOs often restrict the list of BYOD devices they'll support to a smaller subset than the host networks.  MVNOs will often push/favor a specific model phone because it is locked into the host carrier "preferred network" that gives that MVNO the best deal/rates.

Providers supporting multiple host networks use only one of them for each device, depending on the specific phone model and/or SIM card used (except for Google Fi, which switches automatically between the different listed host networks based on factors such as relative signal strength).

Different companies target different markets: typically a subset of business, lifeline, and personal.  Lifeline refers to the Universal Service Fund's Lifeline low-income phone program.  In the case of providers with both Lifeline and non-Lifeline offerings, but different options for each (as opposed to the same options, but different costs), the Lifeline offerings have been put on a separate row with "[Lifeline]" in the "Company" field.  Note that though the Lifeline program is a Federal one, each state is responsible for implementing its own version, so details beyond the basic requirements of the program can differ significantly from state to state (starting with the set of provider companies available).  As of this writing, Lifeline provider info has mostly only been filled in for California and Minnesota.

Most of the MVNOs in this table provide voice, text, and data services to mobile phones ("Yes" in Phone service column; note that this column does not indicate whether the provider sells phones – all providers offering phone service sell phones unless the "BYOD" column contains "Yes, BYOD-only").  Some MVNOs also have data-only offerings, which can be intended for tablets ("Tablet plans available" in Notes column), or can require the purchase (or BYOD) of a dedicated mobile broadband modem, usually in the form of a Wi-Fi Hotspot device ("Yes" in Modem service column; not to be confused with the Tethering / phone hotspot column, which refers to the ability to use a phone or tablet to share data as a Wi-Fi hotspot or via Bluetooth or USB. There are also MVNOs who provide only data service to mobile hotspot devices (mobile broadband providers).

Native Wi-Fi calling refers to the ability of mobile phones on the service to seamlessly use Wi-Fi rather than the cellular network to connect normally dialed calls, when enabled.  It does not refer to the ability to use third-party programs to make calls over Wi-Fi networks, which is generally always supported on smartphones.

Third-party websites have been gaining popularity among American consumers who seek to reduce their expenses on wireless services. These websites have established partnerships with major cellular carriers such as AT&T Mobility, T-Mobile US, and Verizon, to provide customers with discounted plans, along with complimentary or low-priced smartphones and tablets to customers who sign up for services through their portals.

Although certain customers prefer going straight to the major carriers or their MVNO partners, some are drawn to third-party websites due to the unique offers and perks that come along with them. These platforms typically have simplified and expedited signup processes, and may offer additional bonuses such as free shipping or extended warranties.

It's important to keep in mind, however, that not all third-party websites are trustworthy, and some may employ deceitful or fraudulent practices. Thus, it is always advisable for consumers to conduct research and examine reviews prior to engaging in business with any website or service provider.

Wireless mobile broadband operators
The following table is a list of wireless mobile broadband operators.

International SIM voice and data service operators
All MVNOs listed below are BYOD, unless otherwise noted.

IoT service providers
IoT is "Internet of Things", the extension of Internet connectivity (in this case, cellular network–based) into physical devices and everyday objects.

Defunct, merged, and acquired operators

See also
 List of United States wireless communications service providers

Notes

References 

Mobile virtual network operators
Telecommunications lists
Mobile virtual network operators
United States MVNOs
MVNOs
MVNOs